Tinatin Chulukhadze (in Georgian თინათინ ჭულუხაძე) born in 1991, is a Georgian Pop and Folk singer. She's been popular since 2006 when she won Geostar, the Georgian version of the Idol series. She is also known to people as Tiko Chulukhadze, the short version of her first name.

She participated in musical TV Show Bravo in 2010.

References
Official Facebook page
Performance in Georgian Philharmonic Concert Palace
Spanish Music Portal
Geostar-2006

1991 births
Living people
21st-century women singers from Georgia (country)